The 2019–20 Syed Mushtaq Ali Trophy was the eleventh season of the Syed Mushtaq Ali Trophy, a Twenty20 cricket tournament in India. It was contested by 38 teams, divided into five groups, with eight teams in Group E. The group stage started on 8 November 2019. The top two teams from Group E progressed to the Super League section of the competition. Two rain-affected matches from the second day of the tournament were rescheduled to take place on 18 November 2019. After the final day of group stage matches, Delhi and Jharkhand had progressed to the Super League stage of the tournament.

Points table

Fixtures

Round 1

Round 2

Round 3

Round 4

Round 5

Round 6

Round 7

Round 8

References

Syed Mushtaq Ali Trophy
Syed Mushtaq Ali Trophy
Syed Mushtaq Ali